Viljami Kalliokoski (15 May 1894 in Halsua – 20 January 1978) was a Finnish farmer and politician. He was a member of the Agrarian League.

He served as Deputy Minister of Agriculture in Kyösti Kallio's fourth cabinet (7 October 1936 – 12 March 1937) and as Minister of Agriculture in Risto Ryti's second cabinet (15 August 1940 – 4 January 1941), in Jukka Rangell's cabinet (4 January 1941 – 5 March 1943), in Edwin Linkomies' cabinet (5 March 1943 – 8 August 1944), in Antti Hackzell's cabinet (8 August 1944 – 21 September 1944), in Urho Castrén's cabinet (21 September 1944 – 17 November 1944), in Ralf Törngren's cabinet (5 May 1954 – 20 October 1954) and in Urho Kekkonen's fifth cabinet (20 October 1954 – 3 March 1956) as well as a Member of Parliament (5 September 1922 – 5 April 1945 and 22 July 1948 – 19 February 1962).

In 1940–1945 he was the president of the Agrarian League.

References 
 

1894 births
1978 deaths
People from Halsua
People from Vaasa Province (Grand Duchy of Finland)
Centre Party (Finland) politicians
Ministers of Agriculture of Finland
Members of the Parliament of Finland (1922–24)
Members of the Parliament of Finland (1924–27)
Members of the Parliament of Finland (1927–29)
Members of the Parliament of Finland (1929–30)
Members of the Parliament of Finland (1930–33)
Members of the Parliament of Finland (1933–36)
Members of the Parliament of Finland (1936–39)
Members of the Parliament of Finland (1939–45)
Members of the Parliament of Finland (1948–51)
Members of the Parliament of Finland (1951–54)
Members of the Parliament of Finland (1954–58)
Members of the Parliament of Finland (1958–62)
Finnish people of World War II